Atagema carinata is a species of sea slug or dorid nudibranch, a marine gastropod mollusk in the family Discodorididae.

Distribution 
This species was first recorded in the Firth of Thames in New Zealand in the 1820s, but has rarely been seen since. It appears to be a New Zealand endemic.

Description

Ecology

References

Discodorididae
Gastropods of New Zealand
Gastropods described in 1832
Firth of Thames